Little Flower Hospital & Research Centre is a 610-bed multi-specialty hospital in the town of Angamaly, Eranakulam District, about 25 kilometres north of Kochi, situated at the junction of the Main Central Road of Kerala with the National Highway 47. The hospital is run by the Major Archdiocese of Ernakulam -Angamaly of the Syro-Malabar Catholic Church. It offers a number of specialties including Cardiology, General Surgery, Orthopaedics & Trauma, Plastic & Microvascular Surgery, Neurosurgery, Urology, Eye, ENT, General Medicine and its allied specialties, Obstetrics & Gynaecology, Paediatrics etc. The hospital is a regional referral unit for Ophthalmology, trauma and General Surgery.

The hospital has various training programmes at graduate level in the disciplines nursing, physiotherapy, optometry as well as in general nursing and midwifery. The hospital is also recognized by the National Board of Examinations for the training of doctors towards the Diplomate of National Board in General Surgery, General Medicine & Ophthalmology, Orthopaedics, Obstetrics & Gynaecology and Child Health.

Early period 
Little Flower hospital was begun on 9 February 1936 with one doctor, one compounder, a nurse cum mid wife and a ward boy. At that time the inhabitants of Angamaly was struggling to have some facility for medical aid even at times of extreme necessity and the Archbishop of Ernakulam Mar Augustine Kandathil began the hospital under the auspices of the Archdiocese.

Departments 
General Medicine, General Surgery, Ophthalmology, Orthopaedics and Trauma Surgery, Physiotherapy, Obstetrics and Gynecology, Gastroenterology, Gastro-Surgery, Paediatrics, Neonatology, Neurology, Neurosurgery, Nephrology, Anesthesiology and Critical care Medicine, Plastic and Microvascular Surgery, Cardiology, Cardio-Thoracic Surgery, ENT, Urology, Radiology, Hematology, Dental Surgery, Dermatology, Psychiatry, Pathology, Blood bank and Component Therapy Unit

Courses offered 
M.H.A.(Master of Hospital Administration),B.Sc. Nursing, Bachelor Of Physiotherapy(BPT), B.Sc. Optometry, Diploma in Ophthalmic Techniques, Diploma in General Nursing Recognized by Nursing Council of India, Diploma in Medical Lab Technology Recognized by MAI, Diploma in Medical Record Technology recognized by CMAI

Recognitions 

  Medical Research Centre approved by Mahatma Gandhi University
  Approved Training Centre of Government of India for the World Bank Project of training of Professors and Senior Staff members of Medical Colleges in Modern Types of Surgeries in Ophthalmology
  Recognised by WHO for training of Doctors
  Approved by Medical Council of India for Senior House Surgeoncy
  Accredited Training Centre of the National Board of Examinations
  School of Nursing recognised by the Nursing council of India
  College of Nursing recognised by Kerala Nursing Council and Mahatma Gandhi University
  School of Lab Technology and School of Medical Record Technology approved by CMAI
  Recognised by Federation of Ophthalmic Research and Education Centre, New Delhi for Diploma in Ophthalmic Techniques Course
  Approved Centre of Indian Council of Medical Research for research in various field of Ophthalmology
  A member of Haemophilia Association

References

External links

 Official Website

Hospitals in Kochi
1936 establishments in India
Hospitals established in 1936
Buildings and structures in Angamaly